Bremer Marine Park is a marine park extending out from Bremer Bay on the south coast of Western Australia. It is zoned by the Australian government under the 'South West Marine Parks Management plan 2018'  as a national park and hence protects numerous of flora and fauna. This flora and fauna (specifically orca) are the primary contributing factor to the area's popularity and tourism which brings economic and social benefits. However, the area is also subject to many threats to biodiversity and hence has management systems and legislations in place in an attempt to protect its environment, flora and fauna. Overall, Bremer Marine Park is primarily an area of biodiversity enjoyed by tourists and studied by scientists.

Marine life

Environment, flora and fauna 
The environment plays a key role in the activities, behaviours, survival and interactions of flora and fauna in Bremer Bay Marine Park.

The geomorphological construction of Bremer influences the currents, water movements and upwelling events. Bremer Bay contains many different interacting water currents which are highly significant to the survival of flora and fauna in Bremer Marine Park. For example, The Leeuwin Current transports warmer tropical water across the south west coast of Australia. This raises the water temperature in Bremer. Currents also lead to the presence and transport of tropical marine life. For example, the Leeuwin current is significant to the transport and survival of Southern bluefin Tuna, Western Australia salmon, Humpback whales and many species of coral.  

In conjunction with other water currents and the geomorphology of the marine park, 'eddies' are formed. Eddies are circular water currents which contribute to upwelling. Upwelling leads to deep water rising and interacting with shallow surface water. In the Bremer Bay region, this leads to an increase in nutrients (predominantly chlorophyll) and hence biological productivity in surface waters. This increase in nutrients and biological productivity influences the migration and abundance of marine life.

This abundance of marine life is evident in the variety of species found in the area. Numerous species of fish live in the Bremer area including Southern Bluefin Tuna, salmon, Blue Groper and herring. There are also various sharks found in Bremer such as the Whaler and Great White Shark. Additionally, there are also many invertebrate species in the area including squid, crustaceans (such as the blue swimmer crab) and jellyfish. Seabirds are also prevalent and include Shearwater and Petrel species as well as the Albatross. Finally, mammals in the area include Striped, Bottlenose and Common Dolphins, Orca, and Blue Whales.

Food webs 
The interrelationship between organisms was investigated by the University of Western Australia and the Australian government. The defining features of the ecosystems food web include the apex predator being the orca, the keystone species being the squid and krill and the main primary producer being phytoplankton.

Threats to biodiversity

Climate change and global warming 

Climate change is defined as the long term change in weather patterns allowing for Earth's climate to change. Evidence for the Earth's cycle between hothouse and icehouse climates can be found using sedimentation and greenhouse gas data. Global Warming is the scientific theory that humans are raising the Earth's temperature primarily through increasingly burning fossil fuels causing the Earth to trap greenhouse gases which raises the Earth's temperature.

Both climate change and global warming would further cause ocean: temperature levels, acidity and greenhouse gas levels to rise. In turn, this would cause many of the existing flora and fauna to perish or migrate elsewhere. For example, scientists predict that global warming will decrease the abundance of phytoplankton (a keystone species in the Bremer Marine Park food web) in oceans. 

However, some individuals dispute the existence of global warming. The main argument is due to the belief that humans are not impacting temperature, and the temperature increase is only resultant from the natural cycle of Earth's climate between hothouse and icehouse periods. This opinion is less popular among the scientific community due to the compelling evidence against it.

Climate change and global warming also have the ability to disrupt coral more commonly found at Bremer Bay, which will further disrupt food webs and chains. This is because increased temperatures lead to zooxanthellae algae leaving corals. This leads to corals having inadequate nutritional supply, further causing coral bleaching and coral death.

Fishing 
Fishing is a threat to biodiversity in marine areas, and is addressed as a threat to biodiversity in Bremer during a study by the National Environmental Science Programme. This is because fishing will disrupt both food webs and food chains. This is highly significant when keystone species (squid and krill) or apex predators (orca) are removed from the ecosystem. Overfishing is also a major threat to marine ecosystems, since it can both wipe out populations and significantly pollute oceans through oil and fuel leakage.

Management

Management plan 
The Australian Marine parks South-west Network Management plan acts to preserve the Bremer Marine Park ecosystem and maintain its biodiversity in accordance with Cultural, Heritage Socio-economic and Natural values. Bremer Bay Marine park is listed as an IUCN category II national park and was proclaimed under EPBC Act. The IUCN protects two areas in the Marine park being the national park and special purpose zone. Both the IUCN and EPBC Act contribute to the protection of the environment and biodiversity in Bremer Marine Park.

Natural values 
Bremer Bay contains two key ecological features being the ‘Albany Canyon group and adjacent shelf break’, and the ‘Ancient Coastline at 90-120 metres depth contour’. The Albany Canyon group and adjacent shelf break includes Bremer Canyon which hosts many species of marine life. This is most likely due to upwelling events in the Canyon. Upwelling in the canyon is evidenced by higher levels of chlorophyll found in surface water. This is a possible indicator that nutrients have been upwelled to the surface. Higher concentrations of chlorophyll often lead to higher levels of productivity in oceans. This provides reasoning for the abundance of marine life in Bremer Bay Canyons.

The Ancient Coastline contains terraces and steps due to changes in sea level. The most prevalent steps and terraces can form large escarpments which can induce small upwelling events, which as previously mentioned cause higher abundance of marine life.

The Bremer Marine Park also contains two significant bioregions forming parts of the Southern province and South west shelf province. The South West Shelf Province is an area significantly impacted by the Leeuwin current. This area is hence a diverse area for organisms as mentioned in the environment, flora and fauna section. The Southern province is populated by numerous deep submarine canyons reaching depths of approximately 5900m.

Species and habitats are also highly significant to Bremer Bay and are mentioned above in the Environment, Flora and Fauna section.

Heritage values 
The heritage values for individuals and communities is found in socioeconomic and communal activities. For example, activities including fishing, whale and shark watching all contribute to heritage value. However, Bremer Marine Park has no official heritage listings.

Social and economic values 
Economic values are predominantly in tourism activities, commercial fishing and mining. In terms of social activities, tourism offers snorkelling, fishing, whale watching and more wildlife orientated activities.

Cultural values 
The indigenous community has been sustainably using the South Australian land and sea for between 40,000 and 100,000 years. In Bremer Marine park the Noongar people are responsible for the ‘Sea Country’. Sea Country includes all aspects of the area and is described by the government as including: ‘all living things, beliefs, values, creation, spirits and cultural obligations connected to that area.’   The Sea Country is valuable to the area and should be respected to all individuals. Many marine species are also ‘totems’ for indigenous people and are hence valuable and require protection.

Hence, cultural values are superintended by the Noongar people and the South west Aboriginal Land and Sea Council.

Tourism 
Tourism in Bremer Marine Park is primarily through boat tours for whale watching and the easy accessibility to boats via Bremer Bay. Tourists are attracted to the Marine Park due to its abundance of marine life and geological structures. The Bremer Marine Park is specifically an ideal location for tourists due to its reputation to have high quantities of orca. The Bremer Canyon Region hosts nearly 200 orca making it the largest known congregation point for orca in the southern hemisphere.  

Tourism in Bremer Marine Park, can be positive in educating the public about the importance of marine life especially during expeditions. For example, many tourism boats will include tour guides who either are experts in the field or have a passion for wildlife. These individuals will educate tourists about individual animals, importance of biodiversity or even coral bleaching and climate change.

However tourism can also be a threat to biodiversity due to boats creation of underwater noise and fuel leakages. Individuals may also leave waste such as plastics or pollute the ocean with sunscreen which can change the oceans acidity. Changes in ocean acidity can be detrimental for wildlife, especially corals. If the ocean water becomes too acidic, zooxanthellae algae cells will leave corals. Zooxanthellae cells are responsible for coral survival because they use photosynthesis to produce food for the coral. Hence, when zooxanthellae cells leave corals, corals bleach and eventually die. This will change ecosystem dynamics in Bremer Bay which will further lead to change in food webs and biodiversity in Bremer Marine Park.

Exploration
Marine scientists have been conducting research on megafauna in Bremer Marine Park for over a decade. However, overall, the area is a relatively new area of exploration for scientists, however its abundance of marine life and biodiversity is becoming increasingly recognised.

From October 2016 to April 2017 numerous scientists set out to research species interactions with both the biotic and abiotic environment. Specifically speaking scientists attempted to build a food web showing the main interactions between species and their abiotic and biotic environment. Scientists in this investigation concluded that both ocean processes and human activity impacted food webs as previously mentioned in the Marine Life, threats to biodiversity and tourism sections. From 2016 to 2020, scientists have continued to collect data on Orca, Pelagic fish and abiotic factors such as oxygen, chlorophyll a and temperature in the Bremer Marine Park area.

The University of Western Australia, published an article in late February on the deep-sea exploration of the Schmidt Ocean Institute RV Falkor across in Bremer canyon. This was because the scientists on board the ship discovered significant coral sea gardens. These deep sea coral gardens obtain their energy to survive through utilising currents such as the Leeuwin Current. This is because currents distribute small organisms for coral to gain nutrition and energy from. These currents also allow for more adequate water temperatures for coral growth.

See also
 Protected areas managed by the Australian government
 Bremer Bay

References

External links
Official webpage
Research in Bremer Sub-Basin

Australian marine parks
IUCN Category II
IUCN Category IV
Submarine canyons
Geography of the Indian Ocean
2013 establishments in Australia